This is a list of high-rise building fires where the flames were seen to involve the façade.

The original dataset used to create this list  was found by searching news reports and research literature 1990 to 2019, and it may be biased towards high-profile fires and English speaking reporting.

Plot showing the number of large façade fires worldwide every five years from 1990 to November 2019. Data found from news articles and online.

References

High-rise
Skyscrapers